is a Japanese rugby union player who plays as a Prop. He currently plays for Kubota Spears in Japan's domestic Top League.

International
Japan head coach Jamie Joseph has named Kengo Kitagawa in a 52-man training squad ahead of British and Irish Lions test.

References

External links
itsrugby.co.uk Profile
ESPN Rugby Profile

1992 births
Living people
Japanese rugby union players
Rugby union props
Kubota Spears Funabashi Tokyo Bay players
Japan international rugby union players